Rose Mary Boarding School is a private school established in the year 1992 at Sombaray Bazar, Gorubathan, under the Sub-division Kalimpong in Darjeeling district of West Bengal. It is a co-educational English Medium School affiliated to West Bengal Board of Higher Secondary Education.

Private schools in West Bengal
Boarding schools in West Bengal
Schools in Darjeeling district
Educational institutions established in 1992
1992 establishments in West Bengal